Stone Quackers is an American adult animated television series created by Ben Jones. The series premiered October 27, 2014 on FXX as part of their Animation Domination High-Def block.

Despite the Animation Domination High-Def block originally airing on Fox, Stone Quackers itself is the first original show to premiere on FXX.

Plot

Set in the fictional island city of Cheeseburger Island, the series revolves around the surreal misadventures of two ducks, Whit and Clay (respectively voiced by Whitmer Thomas and Clay Tatum), along with their friends Barf (voiced by Ben Jones) and Dottie (voiced by Heather Lawless), and the incompetent Officer Barry (voiced by John C. Reilly), and neighborhood kid Bug (voiced by Budd Diaz).

Production
Stone Quackers was created by Ben Jones, who also created The Problem Solverz for Cartoon Network. After leaving Cartoon Network, Jones began working with Fox Broadcasting Company on their new animation block, Animation Domination High-Def. During this endeavor, Jones pitched Stone Quackers to Fox as a program for the block.
In a July 2013 interview, Jones described this series a "more pure, raw, uncut expression of the same artistic impulse" that manifested Alfe, a character from Solverz. Jones was only allowed to describe that "there will be feathers" in the series.

Characters
 Whit (voiced by Whitmer Thomas) - Whit is a slacker who is prone to erratic behavior and severe lapses of judgement. He is a yellow duck who wears a red hat.
 Clay (voiced by Clay Tatum) - Like his best friend Whit, Clay too is a slacker. He is a blue duck who wears a gray hat. He owns a pet bicolor cat named Gothfield, which is probably, a reference to Garfield.
 Barf (voiced by Ben Jones) - Whit and Clay's fat friend Barf is dim-witted and suffers from poor impulse control, very similar to Alfe from The Problem Solverz, who Jones also voices using the same voice.
 Dottie (voiced by Heather Lawless) - Whit and Clay's friend Dottie lusts after Officer Barry, but mental illness prevents her from forming a relationship with him. 
 Officer Barry (voiced by John C. Reilly) - Barry is an inept police officer who faces abuse from his family at home. He delivers internal monologues whenever he appears. In "Hemispheres", Barry states that he is French-Canadian; his fellow officers think he is Italian.
 Bug (voiced by Budd Diaz) - Bug, a child from the neighborhood, is depicted as naive.

Episodes
Note: The order and titles of episodes differ on streaming and VOD websites.

Broadcast and reception
In December 2013, comedian Sean O'Connor revealed Stone Quackers as one of his additional projects for television.
Meanwhile, Fox announced in April 2014 that the Animation Domination High-Def block would cease broadcast on June 28, 2014, though its programs will continue on digital platforms.
As a result of this, development of the show became unknown.
Stone Quackers was ultimately moved to FXX, where a special preview aired at midnight on October 27, 2014. A short Vine video was also posted by the network.

Dan Nadel—a former publisher of Jones—of The Comics Journal called it Jones' best creation after Problem Solverz.

Spin-off
On May 1, 2015, a spin-off of Stone Quackers, Gothball, was released as a 10-episode web-series that ran weekly on ADHD's YouTube channel. The series stars the bicolor cat Gothball (voiced by John O'Hurley) who interacts with the other characters where he was originally called Gothfield. The series ran from May 1, 2015 to July 3, 2015.

References

External links
 

2014 American television series debuts
2015 American television series endings
2010s American adult animated television series
2010s American sitcoms
2010s American surreal comedy television series
American adult animated comedy television series
American animated sitcoms
American flash adult animated television series
English-language television shows
FXX original programming
Television series by 20th Century Fox Television
Television series by Fox Television Animation
Television series created by Ben Jones
Animated television series about ducks